Kevin Alexander may refer to:
 Kevin Alexander (wide receiver) (born 1975), former American football wide receiver for the New York Giants
 Kevin Alexander (linebacker) (born 1987), American football linebacker for the Denver Broncos